The 2023 United Rentals 200 was the 4th stock car race of the 2023 NASCAR Xfinity Series, and the 19th iteration of the event. The race was held on Saturday, March 11, 2023, in Avondale, Arizona at Phoenix Raceway, a  permanent tri-oval shaped racetrack. The race took the scheduled 200 laps to complete. Sammy Smith, driving for Joe Gibbs Racing, would score the win after holding off Ryan Truex in the closing stages of the race. This was Smith's first career NASCAR Xfinity Series win. He would dominate the race as well, leading 92 laps. To fill out the podium, Truex, driving for Joe Gibbs Racing, and Sheldon Creed, driving for Richard Childress Racing, would finish 2nd and 3rd, respectively.

With his win, Smith became the youngest driver to win at Phoenix Raceway in the Xfinity Series.

Background 
Phoenix Raceway is a 1-mile, low-banked tri-oval race track located in Avondale, Arizona, near Phoenix. The motorsport track opened in 1964 and currently hosts two NASCAR race weekends annually including the final championship race since 2020. Phoenix Raceway has also hosted the CART, IndyCar Series, USAC and the WeatherTech SportsCar Championship. The raceway is currently owned and operated by NASCAR.

Entry list 

 (R) denotes rookie driver.
 (i) denotes driver who is ineligible for series driver points.

Practice 
The first and only practice session was held on Saturday, March 11, at 9:30 AM MST, and would last for 20 minutes.

Qualifying 
Qualifying was held on Saturday, March 11, at 10:00 AM MST. Since Phoenix Raceway is a mile oval, the qualifying system used is a single-car, single-lap system with only one round. In that round, whoever sets the fastest time will win the pole.

Race results 
Stage 1 Laps: 45

Stage 2 Laps: 45

Stage 3 Laps: 110

Standings after the race 

Drivers' Championship standings

Note: Only the first 12 positions are included for the driver standings.

References 

NASCAR races at Phoenix Raceway
2023 United Rentals 200
2023 in sports in Arizona